The Suspicious Husband is a 1747 comedy play by the British writer Benjamin Hoadly.

It premiered at the Covent Garden Theatre in February 1747. The original cast included David Garrick as Ranger, Roger Bridgewater as Strictland, Lacy Ryan as Frankly, William Havard as Bellamy, Henry Woodward as Jack Meggot, Hannah Pritchard as Clarinda, Elizabeth Vincent as Jacintha and Jane Hippisley as Lucetta.

References

Bibliography

 Nicoll, Allardyce. A History of Early Eighteenth Century Drama: 1700-1750. CUP Archive, 1927.

1747 plays
British plays
Comedy plays
West End plays